James L. "Red" Owens (September 2, 1925 – October 11, 1988) was an American professional basketball player.

A 6'3" guard/forward from Baylor University, Owens played two seasons (1949–1950;1951–1952) in the NBA as a member of the Tri-Cities Blackhawks, Anderson Packers, Baltimore Bullets, and Milwaukee Hawks.

Notes

1925 births
1988 deaths
American men's basketball players
Anderson Packers players
Baltimore Bullets (1944–1954) players
Baylor Bears men's basketball players
Milwaukee Hawks players
Shooting guards
Tri-Cities Blackhawks players
Washington Capitols draft picks